Telo Teresa Taitague is a Guamanian musician, businesswoman and politician serving as a Republican senator in the Guam Legislature.

Early life 
Taitague's father is Jose Quinene Lizama Taitague. Taitague's mother is Joyce Frances Schonsby. Taitague has four sisters, Debbie, Tana, Anita, and Kala (1965-2019). In 1978, Taitague graduated from George Washington High School in Mangilao, Guam.

Career 
Taitague is a professional musician. Taitague is a certified insurance agent. As a businesswoman, Taitague established Telephoto Portraits and The Graudate, Inc.

On November 7, 2006, Taitague lost the election for a seat as senator in the Guam Legislature. Taitague received 3.51% of the votes.

On November 4, 2008, Taitague won the election and became a Republican senator in the Guam Legislature. Taitague served her first term on January 5, 2009 in the 30th Guam Legislature. Taitague was also elected as the Assistant Minority Whip.

In February 2015, Taitague was selected as the Deputy General Manager of  Guam Visitors Bureau.

On November 6, 2018, Taitague won the election and became a Republican senator in the Guam Legislature. Taitague served her second term on January 7, 2019 in the 35th Guam Legislature.

On November 3, 2020, Taitague a won the election and continued serving as a senator in the Guam Legislature. Taitague served her third term on January 4, 2021 in the 36th Guam Legislature.

Personal life 
Taitague has two children.

References

External links 
 Telo Taitague at ballotpedia.org
 Telo T. Taitague at ourcampaigns.com
 30th Guam Legislature at guamlegislature.com
 Telo Taitague at dispatch.com
 Legislature moves to hire attorney in investigation of Taitague at kanditnews.com

Guamanian musicians
Guamanian Republicans
Guamanian women in politics
Living people
Members of the Legislature of Guam
Year of birth missing (living people)
21st-century American women